These men won the TVyNovelas Award for executing the best performance by a man in his debut telenovela.

Winners and nominees

1980s

1990s

2000s

2010s

Records 
 Most nominated actors: Rafael Sánchez Navarro with 2 nominations.
 Youngest winner: Armando Araiza, 18 years old.
 Youngest nominee: Christopher von Uckermann, 15 years old.
 Oldest winner: Héctor Soberón, 33 years old.
 Oldest nominee: Alberto Agnesi, 34 years old.
Actors nominated for the same role without winning:
Humberto Elizondo (Cuna de lobos, 1987) and Ignacio Casano (A que no me dejas, 2016)
 Actors winning this category, despite having been as a main villain: Ariel López Padilla (Corazón salvaje, 1994)
 Actors was nominated in this category, despite having played as a main villain:
 Rafael Sánchez Navarro (Bodas de odio, 1984)
 Jaime Camil (Mi Destino Eres Tú, 2001)
 Julio Bracho (La Otra, 2003)
Foreign winning actors:
 Carlos Ponce from Puerto Rico
 Francisco Gattorno from Cuba

References

External links 
TVyNovelas at esmas.com
TVyNovelas Awards at the univision.com

Revelation Male
Male Revelation
Male Revelation
Awards disestablished in 2017
Awards established in 1983